John Harold Tilelli Jr. (born October 2, 1941) is a retired United States Army four-star general who served as Vice Chief of Staff of the United States Army from 1994 to 1995; Commanding General, United States Army Forces Command from 1995 to 1996; and Commander in Chief, United Nations Command/Commander in Chief, ROK/United States Combined Forces Command/Commander, United States Forces Korea from 1996 to 1999. He retired from the United States Army on January 31, 2000 and later worked for the USO and The Aerospace Corporation.

Early life and education
Tilelli was raised in Holmdel Township, New Jersey, and is a 1963 graduate of Pennsylvania Military College, now named Widener University, where he received a degree in economics and was commissioned an armor officer. He earned a master's degree in administration from Lehigh University in 1972 and is a 1983 Army War College graduate. He also holds honorary doctorates in business management from Widener and in law from the University of Maryland.

Military career

Tilelli served two tours in the Vietnam War, four in Germany and three in the Pentagon. His combat tours include assignments as a company commander in Vietnam and as commander of the 1st Cavalry Division during the Gulf War.

Awards and decorations
Tilelli's awards and decorations include the Defense Distinguished Service Medal, the Army Distinguished Service Medal with three Oak Leaf Clusters, the Navy Distinguished Service Medal, the Legion of Merit, the Bronze Star Medal  with "V" Device and two Oak Leaf Clusters, Meritorious Service Medal with three Oak Leaf Clusters, Air Medal, Army Commendation Medal with two Oak Leaf Clusters, Combat Infantryman Badge, Parachutist Badge, Office of the Secretary of Defense Identification Badge, Joint Chiefs of Staff Identification Badge and Army Staff Identification Badge.

Personal life
Since retiring, Tilelli has served as president of the United Service Organizations (USO). He was also elected to the board of trustees of The Aerospace Corporation, and sat on the board of directors of Raytheon until  May 4, 2005. In 2006, he joined the board of directors for Xcelaero. From 2008 to 2014, he served on the board of directors of Military Officers Association of America (MOAA), including a two-year term as chairman of the board from 2012 to 2014.

Notes

References
Belfer Center bio
Center for International Security and Cooperation bio

United States Army generals
United States Army personnel of the Vietnam War
People from Holmdel Township, New Jersey
Recipients of the Distinguished Service Medal (US Army)
Recipients of the Legion of Merit
Lehigh University alumni
Widener University alumni
United States Army War College alumni
1941 births
Living people
United States Army Vice Chiefs of Staff
Recipients of the Air Medal
Recipients of the Defense Distinguished Service Medal
Recipients of the Navy Distinguished Service Medal
Commanders, United States Forces Korea
Military personnel from New Jersey